The Belmont Hotel is located in Pardeeville, Wisconsin. It was added to the National Register of Historic Places in 1993.

History
The hotel was built in the late Victorian architectural style in 1909. Adjacent to the village's train station, the hotel served travelers from multiple daily trains. In 1973, it was donated to the Columbia County, Wisconsin Historical Society and was transformed into the Columbia County Museum, also known as the Myrtle Lintner Spear Museum.

References

External links
 Village of Pardeeville - Myrtle Lintner Spear Museum

Hotel buildings on the National Register of Historic Places in Wisconsin
Museums in Columbia County, Wisconsin
Hotels in Wisconsin
Defunct hotels in the United States
Hotel buildings completed in 1909
National Register of Historic Places in Columbia County, Wisconsin